Memories of a Catholic Girlhood is the autobiography of Mary McCarthy that was published in 1957. The book chronicles McCarthy's childhood including her being orphaned, having an abusive great uncle, and losing her Catholic faith. In the book McCarthy gives details at the end of each chapter that other family members claim do not correspond with their memory of events.

Publication data
Memories of a Catholic Girlhood, 1957, Harvest/HBJ, 1972 reprint:ISBN 0-15-658650-9

References

Literary autobiographies
1957 books
Works by Mary McCarthy
Harcourt (publisher) books